Cheilosia griseiventris is a Palearctic hoverfly. It is not considered as distinct from Cheilosia latifrons (= Cheilosia intonsa) by most European workers. It is variously treated in other and older works.

References

External links
 Images representing Cheilosia latifrons

Diptera of Europe
Eristalinae
Insects described in 1857